The Seattle Sounders FC Community Shield is a club football (soccer) match hosted and organized by the Seattle Sounders FC of Major League Soccer. The match has the Sounders FC club play a select club in a pre-season exhibition match, with the intention to raise money for local charities in the Seattle area. In 2010, the Sounders raised $82,000 and the money was split between the Boys & Girls Clubs of America of Washington state, Seattle SCORES, Soccer Saves, and Washington Youth Soccer.

In 2010, the first Community Shield was held, when the Sounders played their longtime rivals, the Portland Timbers on March 11, 2010. In the match, the Timbers defeated the Sounders 1-0, giving the Timbers their first win in Seattle since 2005.

On March 9, 2011, Sounders and the defending 2010 MLS Cup champions, the Colorado Rapids took the pitch in the 2nd Community Shield with the Sounders winning 3-1.

February 29, 2012, Sounders took on Jaguares from the Mexican Primera División at CenturyLink Field and won 2-0, with two goals from Fredy Montero.

Teams
The following clubs have participated in the Community Shield:

2012:  Jaguares from Mexican Primera División
2011:  Colorado Rapids from Major League Soccer in the United States of America
2010:  Portland Timbers from the USSF Division 2 Professional League in the United States of America

Venue
Seattle hosted the first Community Shield match at their home pitch, CenturyLink Field.

History
Seattle and Portland have one of the biggest rivalries in American sports. In July 2009, Seattle and Portland met in the 2009 Lamar Hunt U.S. Open Cup at PGE Park in Portland, Oregon. Seattle won the game 2-1 from a goal by Roger Levesque in the first minute. The Seattle Sounders – Portland Timbers rivalry started in the North American Soccer League in 1975.

Matches played
Elias Bazakos was the referee for the first game. A total of 18,606 people attended the game. Ryan Pore, a former tryalist for the Sounders, gave an assist to O. J. Obatola, a Portland tryalist from Gombak United FC of the Singaporean S. League. Only one card was given during the match, to James Marcelin who plays in the Haiti national football team. The money raised from the game was $82,000. The money will be split among the Boys & Girls Clubs of America of Washington state, Seattle SCORES, Soccer Saves, and Washington Youth Soccer.

Yader Reyes was the referee for the second match. 7,355 people were in attendance. Jhon Kennedy Hurtado scored the first goal off a Fredy Montero free-kick to give Seattle a 1-0 lead. Colorado responded with a goal from the penalty spot by Jeff Larentowicz. But Fredy Montero scored two goals to claim the victory for the Sounders.

 

11,140 people were in attendance.  Fredy Montero scored the first goal off a header in the 61' minute to give Seattle a 1-0 lead. Chiapas was never able to break through. Later on in the 73' minute Fredy Montero scored another goal, securing the victory for the Sounders.

Overall Goal scorers

References

Seattle Sounders FC
Soccer competitions in the United States
Recurring sporting events established in 2010